District 9 is a 2009 science fiction film directed by Neill Blomkamp.

District 9 may also refer to:

Places
District 9, Boston, district for Boston City Council
District 9, Düsseldorf, a district in that German city
District 9, Ho Chi Minh City, a district in that Vietnamese city
District 9, Zürich, a district in that Swiss city
 District 9, an electoral district of Malta
 District 9, a police district of Malta
IX District, Turku, Finland
New York's 9th congressional district, often referred to as District 9

Art, entertainment, and media
District 9 (band), a New York hardcore band profiled in the 1999 documentary film N.Y.H.C.
 Devyatyi Raion, a Russian pop-rock band whose name translates as "District 9"
District 9 (Hunger Games), fictional district in The Hunger Games universe
"District 9", a 2018 single by South Korean boy band Stray Kids in the extended play titled I Am Not
District 9, a science fiction movie dealing with segregation and discrimination

See also
9th Arrondissement (disambiguation)
District 8 (disambiguation)
District 10 (disambiguation)
District Six, a district in Cape Town, South Africa, that is the basis for the film
Sector 9, a skateboard manufacturer